The 1979 NBA World Championship Series was the championship series played at the conclusion of the National Basketball Association (NBA)'s 1978–79 season. The Western Conference champion Seattle SuperSonics played the Eastern Conference champion Washington Bullets, with the Bullets holding home-court advantage, due to a better regular season record. The SuperSonics defeated the Bullets 4 games to 1. The series was a rematch of the 1978 NBA Finals, which the Washington Bullets had won 4–3.

Dennis Johnson of the SuperSonics was named as the NBA Finals MVP, while Gus Williams of the SuperSonics was the top scorer, averaging 28.6 points per game.

This was Seattle's second men's professional sports championship, following the Seattle Metropolitans' victory in the 1917 Stanley Cup Finals. The city’s next title wouldn’t be until 2014 when the Seahawks won Super Bowl XLVIII.

Both the 1978 and 1979 NBA Finals were informally dubbed the "George Washington series", because both teams were playing in places named after the first President of the United States (the SuperSonics represented Seattle, Washington while the Bullets represented Washington, D.C., albeit playing in nearby Landover, Maryland).

This is the most recent time that a Western Conference team not based in Texas or California has won an NBA title, and the last of only two occasions alongside the 1976–77 Portland Trail Blazers when a team from the present-day Northwest Division has won the league title, which is by 27 years the longest league championship drought for any division of the four major North American sports leagues.  Since then, the following Western teams have gone on to win an NBA title: the Los Angeles Lakers (eleven times), the San Antonio Spurs (five times), the Golden State Warriors (four times), the Houston Rockets (twice), and the Dallas Mavericks (once). The remaining twenty-one titles since 1980 have been won by Eastern Conference teams.

Background
This was a rematch of the 1978 NBA Finals, which the Bullets won 4–3. Seattle made a key offseason trade sending Marvin Webster to the New York Knicks for Lonnie Shelton. Other than that, both teams' rosters stayed virtually intact. Unlike the previous year, both teams finished 1-2 in the NBA, with the Bullets topping the league at 54 wins; the Sonics with 52 wins. In the playoffs, Seattle defeated the Los Angeles Lakers 4–1 and the Phoenix Suns 4–3, while Washington had a much tougher road, eliminating the Atlanta Hawks in an unexpectedly tough seven-game series and coming back from a 3-1 deficit to eliminate the San Antonio Spurs in seven. Both earned a first-round bye.

Television
The Finals were carried by CBS television (the network's NBA on CBS aired league games from 1973-90), with Brent Musburger as the lead announcer. The 1979 Finals has been preserved in full, unlike the previous year's, in which Games 2, 3 and 4 are missing. (Except for 1978, all NBA Finals since 1975 have been completely preserved.)

Road to the Finals

Regular season series
The teams split the four-game series in the regular season:

Series summary

Game summaries

Game 1

The Bullets controlled the game and led by 18 in the fourth, but Seattle mounted a furious comeback to tie it at 97. Larry Wright, who had 26 points off the bench, drove to the basket as time ran down and had his shot blocked by Dennis Johnson, but the referees called a foul on Johnson. Wright went to the line with one second left and hit two of three foul shots (NBA rules at the time awarded an extra free throw attempt when a team was in the penalty foul situation) to win the game.

Game 2

Elvin Hayes had 11 points in the first quarter, but only nine the rest of the way as Seattle turned its defense up a notch, holding the Bullets to 30 points in the second half.

Outside of the two metropolitan areas of the competing teams, as well as Baltimore and Portland, the game was shown on tape delay beginning at 11:35 Eastern and Pacific/10:35 p.m. Central and Mountain. This was the first of six championship series games shown by CBS on tape delay over a three-season span. Four of the six games in the championship series two years later were shown on tape delay outside of the markets of the competing clubs.

Game 3

Seattle dominated this game, which wasn't as close as the final margin indicated. Gus Williams scored 31 points, Jack Sikma had 21 and 17 rebounds, and Dennis Johnson had a fine all-around game with 17 points, 9 rebounds, and two blocked shots.

Game 4

The Sonics won a close one in OT 114–112, staving off a late Bullets comeback behind 36 points by Gus Williams and 32 by Dennis Johnson. Williams and Johnson dominated the Bullets' guards all series, as they were plagued by poor shooting. Johnson also had four blocks in the game, the last on Kevin Grevey with 4 seconds left to ensure the Seattle victory.

Game 5

Back home, Elvin Hayes had a hot first half, scoring 20, but injuries to starting guards Tom Henderson, Kevin Grevey and prolonged poor shooting by their replacements took their toll. Hayes had only nine points in the second half as Seattle closed out the series.

Player statistics

Seattle SuperSonics

Washington Bullets

Team rosters

Seattle SuperSonics

Washington Bullets

See also
 1979 NBA Playoffs

Notes

References

External links
 1979 NBA Playoffs
 NBA.com Season Review: 1978-79

National Basketball Association Finals
Finals
NBA
NBA
May 1979 sports events in the United States
June 1979 sports events in the United States
Basketball competitions in Seattle
1970s in Seattle
1979 in sports in Washington, D.C.
1979 in sports in Washington (state)